Jóhannsson is a surname of Icelandic origin, meaning son of Jóhann. In Icelandic names, the name is not strictly a surname, but a patronymic. The name refers to:

Aron Jóhannsson (born 1990), American-Icelandic soccer player
Barði Jóhannsson (born 1975), Icelandic musician, singer, and composer
Finnur Jóhannsson (born 1955), Icelandic musician, singer, and songwriter
Garðar Jóhannsson (born 1980), Icelandic professional football player
Jóhann Jóhannsson (1969–2018), Icelandic musician, composer, and producer
Ingi Randver Jóhannsson (1936-2010), Icelandic chess player
Kristján Jóhannsson (born 1948), Icelandic operatic tenor

Icelandic-language surnames
Patronymic surnames